The men's marathon event at the 1974 Commonwealth Games was held on 
31 January 1974  in Christchurch, New Zealand.

Course 
The marathon course ran from the start line at Queen Elizabeth II Park in North New Brighton, passing through the central city and Hagley Park, to Christchurch Airport. Athletes then turned around and followed the same route back to the finish line at Queen Elizabeth II Park.

Results

References

Athletics at the 1974 British Commonwealth Games
1974
Comm
1974 Commonwealth Games